Robert Fiske (October 20, 1889 – September 12, 1944) was an American actor on film and stage during the first half of the 20th century.

In the late 1920s, Fiske acted with the Sharp Players at the Pitt Theater in Pittsburgh, Pennsylvania. By the early 1930s, he had his own troupe in Pennsylvania.

Born in Griggsville, Missouri he appeared in 66 films, primarily B-movies and westerns. He died in Sunland, Los Angeles, California of congestive heart failure at the age of 54 and was buried at Forest Lawn Memorial Park (Glendale).

Selected filmography

 The Sky Parade (1936) - Scotty Allen
 Grand Jury (1936) - District Attorney (uncredited)
 Missing Girls (1936) - Ralph Gilmartin
 Alibi for Murder (1936) - Aviator (uncredited)
 Adventure in Manhattan (1936) - Dario - Henchman (uncredited)
 The Cowboy Star (1936) - Movie Director Martin (uncredited)
 Song of the Gringo (1936) - Defense Attorney
 Battle of Greed (1937) - Lawyer Hammond
 The Devil Diamond (1937) - 'Professor' John Henry Morgan, alias Moreland
 The Devil's Playground (1937) - Officer (uncredited)
 Old Louisiana (1937) - Luke E. Gilmore
 Criminals of the Air (1937) - Groom (uncredited)
 The Law Commands (1937) - John Abbott
 Drums of Destiny (1937) - Bill Holston
 Raw Timber (1937) - Bart Williams
 Roaring Six Guns (1937) - Jake Harmon - Banker
 Luck of Roaring Camp (1937) - Sheriff (uncredited)
 Hawaiian Buckaroo (1938) - J.J. Gillespie (uncredited)
 The Purple Vigilantes (1938) - George Drake
 Born to Be Wild (1938) - Man (uncredited)
 Cassidy of Bar 20 (1938) - Clay Allison
 Test Pilot (1938) - Attendant (uncredited)
 Flight into Nowhere (1938) - Dr. Butler
 Numbered Woman (1938) - Bob Wetherby
 The Great Adventures of Wild Bill Hickok (1938, Serial) - Morrell - Phantom Raider Chief
 Religious Racketeers (1938) - The Great LaGagge aka Louis LaGagge aka The Great Garno
 South of Arizona (1938) - Mark Kenyon
 Sunset Trail (1938) - Monte Keller
 The Colorado Trail (1938) - Deacon Webster
 West of the Santa Fe (1938) - Banker Frank Parker
 Crime Takes a Holiday (1938) - Automobile Salesman (uncredited)
 The Lady Objects (1938) - Mr. Horn (uncredited)
 Adventure in Sahara (1938) - Lt. Dumond
 I Am a Criminal (1938) - Attorney Phil Collins
 Smashing the Spy Ring (1938) - Lieutenant General (uncredited)
 The Thundering West (1939) - Harper (uncredited)
 Society Lawyer (1939) - Lefty - Crelliman's Henchman (uncredited)
 They Made Her a Spy (1939) - Davis (uncredited)
 Racketeers of the Range (1939) - Roger Whitlock
 Timber Stampede (1939) - Matt Chaflin
 The Man from Sundown (1939) - Captain Prescott
 Overland with Kit Carson (1939, Serial) - Henry Clay (Ch. 1) (uncredited)
 Sued for Libel (1939) - Radio Actor (uncredited)
 Buried Alive (1939) - Prosecuting Attorney Gerald Storm (uncredited)
 The Shadow (1940, Serial) - Stanford Marshall
 East Side Kids (1940) - Cornwall - aka Robert Morrison
 Passport to Alcatraz (1940) - Stanford Marshall
 Carolina Moon (1940) - Barrett
 Deadwood Dick (1940, Serial) - Ashton - Committeeman [Chs.1-6]
 Colorado (1940) - Mr. Carter (uncredited)
 Before I Hang (1940) - District Attorney
 The Green Archer (1940, TV Series) - Savini
 Texas Terrors (1940) - Barker - Defense Attorney
 Law and Order (1940) - Ed Deal
 Along the Rio Grande (1941) - Doc Randall
 The Big Boss (1941) - George Fellows
 The Apache Kid (1941) - Joe Walker
 International Lady (1941) - Headwaiter (uncredited)
 Borrowed Hero (1941) - Grover Duncan (uncredited)
 Dick Tracy vs. Crime, Inc. (1941, Serial) - Walter Cabot
 Today I Hang (1942) - Det. Johnson
 A Tragedy at Midnight (1942) - Ricci's Doctor (uncredited)
 Black Dragons (1942) - Phillip Wallace
 Riders of the Northland (1942) - Mr. Strong (uncredited)
 Vengeance of the West (1942) - Gil Kirby
 The Secret Code (1942, Serial) - Investigator Ryan
 Gentleman Jim (1942) - Telegrapher (uncredited)
 The Valley of Vanishing Men (1942, Serial) - Harvey Cole (uncredited)
 Dead Man's Gulch (1943) - James Westfall (uncredited)
 Batman (1943, Serial) - Foster [Ch. 1-4] (uncredited)
 The Texas Kid (1943) - Naylor
 The Last Horseman (1944) - Barkley (uncredited)
 Cyclone Prairie Rangers (1944) - Emil 'Sierra' Weber aka Ed Wayne (uncredited) (final film role)

References

External links

 
 
 

American male film actors
Male Western (genre) film actors
Male actors from Missouri
1889 births
1944 deaths
20th-century American male actors
Burials at Forest Lawn Memorial Park (Glendale)